Víctor Raúl Pérez Raya (born 11 February 1981) is a Spanish-born British film director, producer, screenwriter and visual effects artist who has worked on a number of Hollywood films, including The Dark Knight Rises (Dir. Christopher Nolan, 2012), Rogue One: A Star Wars Story (Dir. Gareth Edwards, 2016), Harry Potter and the Deathly Hallows (Dir. David Yates, 2010), Pirates of the Caribbean: On Stranger Tides (Dir. Rob Marshall, 2011) and 127 Hours (Dir. Danny Boyle, 2010), plus many more.

In 2015 Perez delved into the world of film directing. Since then, he has released two short films and received more than 27 awards and nominations for his debut Another Love (2015). His second short film ECHO (2017) uses pioneering, never-seen-before visual effects technology and was shot in just five long takes. Perez’s love of story telling combined with his award-winning directing and visual effects artistry has positioned him as an up-and-coming film director and a one-to-watch in the industry.

Early life

Perez began to develop a keen eye for film when he was just six years old. He started to make stop motion animation films by borrowing a camera from his older brother who is a professional photographer and an enormous influence in Perez’s life. After seeing Star Wars in the cinema when he was just a child, Perez was inspired to explore computer graphics which he became increasingly talented at, so much so that he acquired his first professional job as a graphic designer at the age of 16. He also began acting when he joined a drama school in his early teens which later attributed to his love of storytelling.

Stage education and early career 
Perez studied performing arts first at the Escuela Municipal de Teatro "Duque de Rivas"  in Lucena (his birthplace), and then at the Escuela Superior de Arte Dramático in Málaga, Spain, graduating in 2004.

Before his studies, Perez's focus was working on stage mainly as an actor. Whilst in Drama School, he founded Gestus, where he began directing and producing on the stage with plays including El Tendedero, Versus and The Zanni Comedy, which he co-produced with Commedia dell'arte director Antonio Fava.

This path saw him land his first acting role in Summer Rain (Dir. Antonio Banderas, 2006). After shooting the film, Perez traveled to Italy in July 2006 to study Commedia dell'arte and renaissance mask making under renowned master Antonio Fava, as well as working with the Spanish stage company Laviebel.

Once established in Italy, he decided to leave acting and dedicate himself to studying cinema, directing film and storytelling.

Perez then went on to study at the International Academy of Image Arts and Sciences (Accademia dell'Immagine) in L'Aquila, Italy which was founded by three times Academy Award winning cinematographer Vittorio Storaro (Apocalypse Now, 1979; The Last Emperor, 1987; Dick Tracy, 1990; Last Tango in Paris, 1972) and Gabriele Lucci since the late 1980s. Here Perez studied film direction and earned an honorary degree. Alongside his studies and to further hone his skills, Perez frequently traveled to the U.S. to study visual effects from Steve Wright.

At 3.32 a.m. on April 6, 2009, Perez's home and studio were destroyed in the earthquake in L'Aquila. In his TED Talk at TEDxVicenza, Perez reveals that both him and his wife barely made it outside their house before it collapsed. He said, "In less than 22 seconds we lost our home, our studio and our little bed and breakfast. My wife and I were literally on the street with just our pyjamas on. We weren't event wearing shoes and it was only 30°F (4°C)."

After barely escaping the collapse of his home in Italy, something changed in Perez. Inspired by his role model Luke Skywalker, Perez took this as his moment to overcome adversity and acquire a career he once only dreamed of. Instead of learning "The Force" - as he jokes in his TED Talk at TEDxVicenza - Perez dedicated himself to learning NUKE and the art of digital compositing, giving chance to a career as a VFX artist. Before this, Perez had only worked on computer graphics as a side job, but that was all about to change.

Education and career

After the earthquake and with a new focus on a career in visual effects, Perez quickly became well known as a VFX artist. Continuing to master his now renowned visual effects skills, Perez moved to London to complete his formation in Visual Effects (VFX) at Escape Studios. Following his graduation from Escape, Perez worked on several projects for broadcast, such as the Gorillaz music video "Stylo" before he went to the recently opened studio Union VFX, where he was the first artist to start in his studio and began working on the Fox Searchlight film 127 Hours directed by Danny Boyle as both digital compositor and technical director. Perez then relocated to Canada to work for IMAX Corporation, before returning to London to work at Cinesite and then Double Negative. He went on to co-found Masked Frame Pictures where he co-produced and starred in the 2013 short film Project Kronos directed by Hasraf "Haz" Dulull. Later that year Haz funded his own company Haz Films and Perez acquired Masked Frame Pictures in full.

With an impressive repertoire of experience and a mastery of visual effects under his belt, Perez quickly became a certified NUKE trainer. Since then, he has taught master classes globally throughout various institutions such as Pixar Animation Studios, The Animation Workshops, and Escape Studios. Perez also focuses on specific areas of visual effects publishing his own courses with FXPHD and CMIVFX online.

Perez became a member of the Visual Effects Society (VES) and a member and regular collaborator of Nukepedia, and online community for NUKE compositors. Here he has published articles, tools and Python programming scripts for artists and was voted twice as one of the most values contributors to the VFX community.

In 2013, Perez started the development of his short film The Girl and the Mask, and whilst shifting his focus to film directing, he continued to make his mark in the VFX industry. His experience in visual effects has seen him work on notable films such as Rogue One: A Star Wars Story (Dir. Gareth Edwards, 2016); The Dark Knight Rises (Dir. Christopher Nolan, 2012); Harry Potter and the Deathly Hallows (Dir. David Yates, 2010) and Pirates of the Caribbean: On Stranger Tides (Dir. Rob Marshall, 2011) to name a few.

Film directing 
Perez’s love for story telling had always been in his blood, but after landing his first acting role in the film Summer Rain (Dir. Antonio Banderas, 2006), he understood the art of conveying a story to an audience. This experience was a huge influence on him and helped guide the steps Perez would next take into the film industry.

Since building a huge portfolio in visual effects and acclaim in the film industry, Perez started his dream career as a director with the short film Another Love in 2015. He wrote and directed the film and received more than 27 awards and nominations in more than 60 film festivals around the world, including the Festival de Cannes. The film depicts the efforts to avoid a necessary separation when a pregnant married woman (Maria Ruiz) struggles to tell a much older man (Nigel Barber) that their affair is over. Soon this unnatural situation forces her to face the truth. Described by the critics as “excellent as it is – dense narrative, very good character construction, neat camera work. Not very often we can say that a short is better than a feature film, or a short has no future potential to be transformed into a long movie, but 'Another Love' is a one of a kind piece; it is a must-watch for every film freak!”

In early 2016 and with the acclaim of Another Love, Victor began writing and directing his second short film ECHO. Unlike Another Love, Perez focused on ECHO as a way of bringing together his abilities as VFX artist to explore new ways of storytelling. The experimental film is about girl who wakes up in the middle of nowhere only to see her reflection in a mirror 10 seconds ahead of her time. When she wakes up again, the nightmare starts over.

To create this never-before-seen mirroring footage, ECHO featured a pioneering motion control technology that was developed at Stiller Studios in Stockholm, Sweden - by Tomas Tjernberg and Tomas Wall - synchronising for the first time two motion control rigs: the massive and pixel-accurate Cyclops® and the fastest and versatile Bolt®, both manufactured by the highly regarded Mark Roberts.

Months of research and development, rehearsals and planning were necessary to accomplish the “Echo Mirroring Effect”. Stiller Studios – owned by Patrik Forsberg – brought a state-of-the-art motion control technology featuring a 3D virtual representation of their real sound stage to allow the filmmakers to design a choreography with the actress to match the virtual world to the real one and vice versa, with visual feedback in real time. This was truly a teamwork effort of narrative visual effects to capture a complex vision in a simple cinematic way.

“I wanted to take this technology at its maximum expression in terms of narrative to tell the story of ECHO, and the team at Stiller Studios accepted the challenge. The result is a whole short film shot entirely in just five long takes, with an actress who is synchronised with the camera movements as a hidden musical choreography. But after all technicalities and technology, I had always one key element in mind: tell a good story in a new way that’s never been seen before. Integrating VFX at the service of storytelling, not the other way around,” said Perez.

Awards and honours 
Perez worked on the visual effects team for Harry Potter and the Deathly Hallows – Part 1, which won a BAFTA award for visual effects in 2012. He was also voted the year’s most valuable contributors in 2012 and 2017 on Nukepedia, and in 2008, he won the Golden Pixel Award at the Maine Media Workshop.

Perez’s directing debut Another Love achieved great acclaim receiving more than 27 nominations and awards at more than 60 films festivals since 2015.

With Echo, his second work as film director, Victor Perez collected 19 statuettes and it made history being the first short film ever to receive a nomination at the VES Awards for its Outstanding Virtual Cinematography, nominated along multimillion films such as Steven Spielberg's Ready Player One or Robert Zemeckis Welcome to Marwen among others blockbusters.

In 2019 Victor Perez received the highest honour from the Italian Academy of Motion Picture being awarded with the David Di Donatello (the Italian equivalent to the Oscar®) for his work as visual effects supervisor on The Invisible Boy: Second Generation.

David Di Donatello (Italian Academy Award)

Visual Effects Society (VES) Awards

Annual Gold Movie Awards

Los Angeles Film Awards

Festigious International Film Festival

Hollywood International Motion Picture Film Festival

Gold Movie Film Festival

WorldFest Houston International Film Festival

One-Reeler Short Film Competition

Independent Shorts Awards

Best Shorts Competition

Sydney Indie Film Festival

Carmarthen Bay Film Festival

Flixxfest Film Festival

Beaufort International Film Festival, US

Hudson Valley International Film Festival

Short Stop International Film Festival

Accolade Competition

California Film Awards

Marbella Film Festival

Visioni Corte Film Festival

Canada Shorts Film Festival

Southampton International Film Festival

Filmography

Film Director
 Ensemble - In development
 ECHO (Short) - (2017)
 Another Love (Short) - (2015)
 The Girl and the Mask - In development

Visual Effects
 Immaculate - visual effects supervisor (2023)
 Unwanted (TV Series) - visual effects consultant (2023)
 All My Crazy Love - visual effects supervisor (2019)
Il Ragazzo Invisibile: Seconda Generazione - visual effects supervisor (2018)
 ECHO (Short) - visual effects supervisor (2017)
 Rogue One: A Star Wars Story - senior compositor (2016)
 Another Love (Short) - visual effects supervisor (2015)
 Top 10 Natural Disasters - compositing supervisor (2013)
 Trance - visual effects artist (2013)
 Un Giorno Devi Andare - digital compositor (2013)
 Les Misérables - digital compositor (2012)
 Viaje a Surtsey - lead compositor (2012)
 The Dark Knight Rises - digital compositor (2012)
 Total Recall - digital compositor [uncredited] (2012)
 The Bourne Legacy - digital compositor (2012)
 John Carter - digital compositor (2012)
 Haywire - digital compositor (2011)
 Will - digital compositor (2011)
 Il Generale Della Rovere (TV Movie) - digital compositor (2011)
 Pirates of the Caribbean: On Stranger Tides - digital compositor (2011)
 40 Years (Short) - lead compositor (2010)
 This is My Land... Hebron (Documentary) - visual effects supervisor (2010)
 Harry Potter and the Deathly Hallows – Part 1 - digital compositor (2010)
 127 Hours - digital compositor / compositing TD (2010)

Writer 
 ECHO (Short) - (2017)
 Another Love (Short) - (2015)
 Ensemble - Co-Writer

Producer
 ECHO (Short) - (2017)
 Another Love (Short) - (2015)
 Project Kronos (Short) - 2013

Actor
 Another Love (Short) - Doctor (2015)
 Project Kronos (Short) - Jonathan Drakensko (2013)
 Summer Rain - González Cortés (2006)

Certification and affiliation
Victor Perez is a certified NUKE trainer, a digital compositing software produced and distributed by The Foundry. NUKE is used for film and television post-production. He has taught master classes throughout various institutions such as Pixar Animation Studios, The Animation Workshops, and Escape Studios. Perez also publishes his monographic VFX courses with FXPHD online.

Perez is a member of the Visual Effects Society (VES), an organization of people in the visual effects industry, including artists, technologists and model makers who work in film, television, commercials, music videos and games. He is also a Member and collaborator of Nukepedia, an online community for NUKE compositors, where he publishes articles, tools and Python programming scripts for artists.

References

External links
 Official website
 Personal website
 

Living people
1981 births
People from Lucena, Córdoba
Spanish film directors